Desmodoridae is a family of nematodes belonging to the order Desmodorida.

Genera

Genera:
 Acanthopharyngoides Chitwood, 1936
 Acanthopharynx Marion, 1870
 Adelphos Ott, 1997

References

Nematodes